Jan Muijs (21 February 1898 – 15 May 1968) was a Dutch wrestler. Muijs competed in Greco-Roman wrestling at the 1924 Summer Olympics. He won a bronze medal at the 1921 World Wrestling Championships.

References

1898 births
1968 deaths
Dutch male sport wrestlers
Olympic wrestlers of the Netherlands
Wrestlers at the 1924 Summer Olympics
Sportspeople from Beverwijk